The concept of the metaphysics of presence is an important consideration in deconstruction. Deconstructive interpretation holds that the entire history of Western philosophy with its language and traditions has emphasized the desire for immediate access to meaning, and thus built a metaphysics or ontotheology based on privileging Presence over Absence.

Overview
In Being and Time (1927; transl. 1962), Martin Heidegger argues that the concept of time prevalent in all Western thought has largely remained unchanged since the definition offered by Aristotle in the Physics. Heidegger says, "Aristotle's essay on time is the first detailed Interpretation of this phenomenon [time] which has come down to us. Every subsequent account of time, including Henri Bergson's, has been essentially determined by it." Aristotle defined time as "the number of movement in respect of before and after". By defining time in this way Aristotle privileges what is present-at-hand, namely the "presence" of time. Heidegger argues in response that "entities are grasped in their Being as 'presence'; this means that they are understood with regard to a definite mode of time – the 'Present'". Central to Heidegger's own philosophical project is the attempt to gain a more authentic understanding of time. Heidegger considers time to be the unity of three ecstases: the past, the present, and the future.

Deconstructive thinkers, like Jacques Derrida, describe their task as the questioning or deconstruction of this metaphysical tendency in Western philosophy. Derrida writes, "Without a doubt, Aristotle thinks of time on the basis of ousia as parousia, on the basis of the now, the point, etc. And yet an entire reading could be organized that would repeat in Aristotle's text both this limitation and its opposite." This argument is largely based on the earlier work of Heidegger, who in Being and Time claimed that the theoretical attitude of pure presence is parasitical upon a more originary involvement with the world in concepts such as the ready-to-hand and being-with.

The presence to which Heidegger refers is both a presence as in a "now" and also a presence as in an eternal present, as one might associate with God or the "eternal" laws of science. This hypostatized (underlying) belief in presence is undermined by novel phenomenological ideas, such that presence itself does not subsist, but comes about primordially through the action of our futural projection, our realization of finitude and the reception or rejection of the traditions of our time.

In his short work Intuition of the Instant, Gaston Bachelard attempts to navigate beyond, or parallel to, the Western concept of 'time as duration' – as the imagined trajectorial space of movement. He distinguishes between two foundations of time: time viewed as a duration, and time viewed as an instant. Bachelard then follows this second phenomenon of time and concludes that time as a duration does not exist, but is created as a necessary mediation for increasingly complex beings to persist. The reality of time for existence, though, is in fact a reprisal of the instant, the gestation of all existence every instant, the eternal death that gives life.

See also 
 Being and Time
 Deixis
 Hypokeimenon

References 

Concepts in metaphysics
Continental philosophy
Deconstruction
Jacques Derrida
Martin Heidegger